Cinnemousun Narrows Provincial Park is a provincial park in British Columbia, Canada, located on Shuswap Lake at the convergence of the lake's four arms.

References
BC Parks webpage

Provincial parks of British Columbia
Parks in the Shuswap Country
1956 establishments in British Columbia